Stairfoot is a ward in the metropolitan borough of Barnsley, South Yorkshire, England.  The ward contains ten listed buildings that are recorded in the National Heritage List for England.  All the listed buildings are designated at Grade II, the lowest of the three grades, which is applied to "buildings of national importance and special interest".  The ward is to the southeast of the centre of Barnsley, and contains the village of Ardsley.  The listed buildings consist of houses and associated structures, a canal bridge, a former water mill, two cemetery chapels, former colliery buildings, and a memorial to a colliery disaster.


Buildings

References

Citations

Sources

 

Lists of listed buildings in South Yorkshire
Buildings and structures in the Metropolitan Borough of Barnsley